Senator Barstow may refer to:

Gamaliel H. Barstow (1784–1865), New York State Senate
Gideon Barstow (1783–1852), Massachusetts State Senate
John L. Barstow (1832–1913), Vermont State Senate